Martin Landolt (born 30 June 1968 in Näfels; Place of origin in Glarus Nord) is a Swiss politician and member of the Swiss National Council for the Conservative Democratic Party of Switzerland (BDP). From May 2012 to December 2020, he served as the President of the BDP.

Career 
Landolt completed an apprenticeship at the Glarner Kantonalbank. Later he completed a part-time diploma in economics. From November 2010 until October 2013 he worked at UBS as a political advisor.

Politics 
From 2003 to 2008 he was Vice-President of the Glarus branch of the SVP. He was President of the Landrat for the year 2006–2007. On 19 May 2008 he announced his resignation as vice-president and his departure from the party, claiming that the party no longer reflected his liberal values, finding fault with the party's style, and accusing it of a lack of fairness in internal disputes. His departure from the party came in the context of the SVP's expulsion of its Grisons branch after it refused to expel Federal Councillor Eveline Widmer-Schlumpf from the party.

In July 2008 he assumed the presidency of the "Liberal group" in the Glarus Landrat. On 28 August 2008, with around 100 others, he co-founded the Conservative Democratic Party of Glarus Canton: he was selected as party president, a role which he retained until April 2012. In October 2008, he participated in the establishment of the national BDP and he was elected to the National Council under the BDP banner on 8 February 2009 in the by-election which followed the resignation of Werner Marti. With his election, the BDP passed the threshold required to qualify as a parliamentary group and from spring 2009 it formed its own group in the Federal Assembly. Landolt was sworn in as a National Councillor on 2 March 2009. He served on the Committee for Finance (CdF-N), until December 2011. After he was re-elected to the National Council in the 2011 elections, he served on the Committee for Political Institutions (CIP-N) and the Committee for Transport and Telecommunications (CTT-N).

On 5 May 2012, Landolt was elected by acclamation as the new President of the BDP, succeeding Hans Grunder.

Landolt made a notable social policy step in June 2014, when he announced the BDP's support for same-sex marriage and LGBT adoption, simultaneously denouncing the SVP for homophobia. This announcement made the BDP the first Swiss right-of-center party to make completely equal rights for members of the LGBT community official party policy.

Personal life
Landolt is separated from his wife and is father to three daughters. He lives in Näfels.

References

Bibliography 
 Martin Landolt on the website of the Federal Assembly (27 August 2013).

External links 
 
 Personal website of Martin Landolt

People from the canton of Glarus
Members of the National Council (Switzerland)
Leaders of political parties
Conservative Democratic Party of Switzerland politicians
Swiss People's Party politicians
1968 births
Living people